Millport was a radio situation comedy, initially broadcast on BBC Radio 4 between 22 March 2000 and 6 December 2002. It starred Lynn Ferguson and Janet Brown, and the show was written by Lynn Ferguson.

Premise
Barmaid Irene Bruce lives in the town of Millport, which she refers to as a 'a scabby wee town on a scabby wee island', as the only town on the island of Great Cumbrae in the Firth of Clyde in Scotland. She hankers after a life on a larger stage on the mainland, away from the boredom where she is cranky and sexually frustrated, but at the same time unattracted to anyone around her.

She has an infuriatingly sweet, but dull, sister Moira who writes articles for the magazine The People's Friend, who also has a dog named Robert that can talk. Nearby Ritz Cafe owner Alberto is obsessed that the Sicilian Mafia will come to take over his business, and lives with adopted daughter Ina.

Cast
 Lynn Ferguson as Irene Bruce
 Janet Brown as Moira Bruce and Agnes Scobie
 Louis McLeod as Bob Scobie, Alberto and Robert (the dog)
 Mark Costello as Dougie
 Robert Patterson as Minister
 Gabriel Quigley as Bunty Pierce, Ina and Betty Sturgeon

Episodes

Series 1

Series 2

Series 3

Television pilot
The series was adapted for a television pilot which aired on BBC One Scotland on the 30 June 2002. The show also starred Lynn Ferguson in the role of Irene.

References

External links
 

BBC Radio 4 programmes
The Cumbraes
BBC Radio comedy programmes